Asociația Club Sportiv Olimpic Snagov commonly known as Olimpic Snagov is a professional Romanian football club based in Snagov, Ilfov County.

Founded in 1997, originally as CS Snagov, the club played five seasons in Divizia B, the second tier of the Romanian football league system, before being dissolved in 2012. Re-founded in 2013 as Voința Snagov, the club was dissolved once again in 2016, but re-founded in 2021 as Olimpic Snagov.

History
The club was founded in 1997 as CS Snagov and played in Divizia D – Ilfov County the fourth tier of the Romanian football league system. In 2002, the club acquiring a place in the Third Division. In 2003, the football department became independent under the name FC Snagov.

In the first two seasons, the club was able to narrowly secure the place in Divizia C finishing 11th in 2002–03 season and 12th in the 2003–04.

In the 2004–05 season, FC Snagov was able to leave the lower places of the table and finish the season in 5th place. In the next season, with Laurențiu Tudor as head coach, FC Snagov clearly won the Series III of Divizia C at eight points in front of 2nd place, Dunărea Călărași, and promoted for the first time in the Second Division.

However,  their spell in Liga II was short lived, FC Snagov finished the 2006–07 season only 16th, 13 points behind and relegated.

Finishing 1st, under the guidance of Mihai Stoica, Snagovenii returned quickly to Liga II at the end of the 2007–08 Liga III season,  this time managing to maintained in the Second Division finishing the 2008–09 season in 12th place.

In the summer of 2009, Laurențiu Reghecampf officially ended his active career and convinced Lutz Stache, the managing director and owner of a building materials company from Cottbus, to make a financial commitment to FC Snagov. Although Stache paid off the club's old debts to the players, he did not become the main shareholder of FC Snagov as initially announced. After the away defeat at Dunărea Galați, Reghecampf's wife, Anamaria Prodan, became the new club president on 21 October 2009, and Cristian Țermure succeeded Mihai Stoica as the official new coach of the team. In fact, Reghecampf held this post, but he was hired as sports director due to the lack of a valid UEFA Pro license and was listed as a masseur in the match report sheets. The team finished the 2009–10 season in fourth place, which was the club's best result. Reghecampf and his wife had left the club on 14 May 2010, five games before the end of the season.

Laurenţiu Tudor was appointed technical director and George Dumitru replaced Cristian Țermure as head coach in the summer of 2010.

Laurenţiu Reghecampf returned to FC Snagov on 30 November 2010, after Cătălin Rufă, one of the club's shareholders, became the new owner of CSM Râmnicu Vâlcea in early September 2010, he was followed by, technical director Tudor. and the previous coach George Dumitru became his assistant.

However, he left FC Snagov in January 2011 to work as sporting director at FC U Craiova, so George Dumitru was again promoted to head coach. On 3 March 2011, Reghecampf returned one more time, but only stayed until 4 April 2011, when he moved to Craiova again, this time as head coach.  The club ended the 2010–11 season again in lower table under coach George Dumitru.

In June 2011, Reghecampf returned as coach of the team. However, on 18 December 2011 Reghecampf resigned to replace Laurențiu Diniță as coach of Concordia Chiajna in Liga I.

After Apostol Mușat, the mayor of Snagov, was arrested on 22 December 2011 on corruption charges and seven players followed Reghecampf to Chiajna, the club was on the verge of withdrawing from 2011–12 Liga II. However, in early January 2012, the club's investors agreed to continue and Laurențiu Tudor was hired as the new coach. However, shortly thereafter,  the club withdrew and stopped playing.

Voința Snagov won Liga IV – Ilfov County at the end of the 2013–14 season, as well as the promotion play-off against Ialomița County champions, Unirea Fierbinți.

Honours
Liga III
Winners (2): 2005–06, 2007–08

Liga IV – Ilfov County
Winners (1): 2013–14

Former players 
The footballers enlisted below have had international cap(s) for their respective countries at junior and/or senior level and/or more than 50 caps for Voința Snagov.

   Marian Zeciu
   Roberto Iancu
   Viorel Dinu
   Adrian Popa
   Lucian Filip
   Sergiu Hanca
   Alexandru Radu
   Gigel Ene
   Anton Petrea
   Irinel Voicu

Managers 

   Ion Vlădoiu 
   Mihai Stoica 
   Cristian Țermure 
   Laurențiu Reghecampf 
   George Dumitru
   Laurențiu Tudor
   Marin Dună

References

Football clubs in Romania
Football clubs in Ilfov County
Association football clubs established in 1997
Liga II clubs
Liga III clubs
Liga IV clubs
1997 establishments in Romania